Rourkela Railway Division refers to a campaign for a new railway division which would include Sundargarh, Jharsuguda and Kendujhargarh districts of Orissa, under EcoR. These stations are now under SER.  Subrat Patnaik and the members of the Rourkela Development Forum have publicly demanded such a division. Recently Shri Naveen Patnaik demanded Inclusion of Rourkela and Jajpur as Railway division under EcoR(currently
These stations are under SER) following division of Waltair division from EcoR, which would lead to Unification of Railways in Odisha

Proposed routes and stations
Proposed Rourkela Division can consist of the following routes
 Rourkela-Biramitrapur
 Rourkela-Nuagaon
 Rourkela-Jaraikela
 Rourkela-Barsuan-Kiriburu Mines
 Rourkela-Jharsuguda-Brajarajnagar-Belpahar
 Bimalagarh-Talcher railway route ( faster completion needed)
 Bansapani-Bimalagarh route (work initiation needed)
 Kiriburu-Gua
 Kiriburu-Bolanikhadan
 Jharsuguda-Sundargarh-Talsara

The expected station list under Rourkela Division are as follows
1.Rourkela Junction 2.Jharsuguda Junction 3.Bimalagarh Junction 4.Bondamunda Junction 5.Bisra 6.Bhalulata 7.Jaraikela 8.Manoharpur 9.Kuarmunda 10.Quarry Siding 11.Panposh 12.Bangurkela 13.Bispur 14.Nuagaon(Nawagaon) 15.Dumetra/Dumerta 16.Lathikata 17.Champajharan 18.Chandiposh 19.Patasahi 20.Gagnapose 21.Barsuan 22. Roxi 23.Rangra 24.Tupadih 25.Karampada 26.Kiriburu 27.Kalunga 28.Kanshbahal 29.Rajgangpur 30.Sonakhan 31.Sagra 32.Garpos 33.Tangarmunda 34.Bamra 35.Dharuadih 36.Bagdihi 37.Panpali 38.Dhutra 39.Brundamal 40.Lapanga 41.Rengali 42.Ib 43. Brajarajnagar 44.Belpahar 45. Hemagiri 46.Gua 47.Barjamda 48.Bolanikhadan 49.Barbil 50.Noamundi 51.Padapahar 52.Deojhar 53. Murga Mahadev 54.Banspani 55. Jaroli 56. Hemagiri 57.Daghora 58.Jamga 59.Kotarlia 60.Nayagarh 61. Goaldih 62. Porjanpur 63. Kendujhargarh

References

General references
 ‘Neglect’ by Railways: BJD launches sit-in
 Neglect of Rourkela by Railways

External links
 Rourkela Railway Division demanded
 Indefinite Rail Roko in Rourkela
 "Mining District Yet to Get Due Railway Share" 24 June 2014

Sundergarh district
South Eastern Railway zone
Transport in Rourkela